Flinn is an unincorporated community in Monroe County, Mississippi.

References

Unincorporated communities in Monroe County, Mississippi
Unincorporated communities in Mississippi